Jean Coquelin (1865–1944) was a French film and stage actor and the son of Benoît-Constant Coquelin.

Filmography

Bibliography
 Finkielman, Jorge. The Film Industry in Argentina: an Illustrated Cultural History. McFarland & Co, 2004.
 Hartnoll, Phyllis, editor (1983). The Oxford Companion to the Theatre (fourth edition). Oxford: Oxford University Press. .

External links

1865 births
1944 deaths
French male film actors
French male stage actors
Male actors from Paris
20th-century French male actors